It's Halloween is a picture book written by Jack Prelutsky and illustrated by Marylin Hafner, published in 1977. The book is a collection of children's poems with a Halloween theme.

Scholastic edition 
The edition published by Scholastic Book Services (a division of Scholastic Inc.) omits one poem titled "Trick...". As a result, the subsequent poem "...or Treat" was retitled as simply "Treat". The Scholastic edition also omits several pages and illustrations.

References

1977 children's books
1977 poetry books
American picture books
American poetry collections
Children's poetry books
Halloween children's books
Greenwillow Books books